Happy Xmas is the first Christmas album by Eric Clapton as well as his twenty-first solo studio album which was released on 12 October 2018. It includes 13 covers of Christmas-themed songs (15 on the European re-release), both well-known and relatively obscure ones, arranged in a predominantly blues style, and one new composition by Clapton and producer Simon Climie.

Conception
During the 23-minute television special A Clapton Christmas, which includes excerpts from a longer interview with producer/musician Simon Climie, Clapton says that the original inspiration for the album came from his wife Melia about three years before the album was produced. She had been listening to the Christmas-themed playlists which her husband created every year on his mobile phone for the end-of-year holiday season; one day, she left him a message on his phone: "Why don't you do a Christmas album?" Clapton was initially reluctant, as many of his favourite artists had done likewise before him, but he was convinced after he started working with pianist and keyboard player Walt Richmond (from The Tractors), who came up with unconventional harmonizations and arrangements for most of the tracks.

"For Love on Christmas Day" was written in early 2018 as "Living in a Dream World", when Clapton completed a fragmentary tune by Simon Climie and wrote lyrics to it. At the time, the album was supposed to be a regular studio album rather than a Christmas one. Upon deciding to make it such, Clapton changed two lines of lyrics in the last verse - the only ones which actually include the word "Christmas".

"Home for the Holidays" and "It's Christmas" are taken from American soul singer Anthony Hamilton's 2014 holiday-themed album, also called Home for the Holidays. Clapton discovered his music on Spotify and called him "the best soul singer on the planet".

The song "Christmas in My Hometown", according to Clapton's comments on a flexi disc included with the deluxe edition of the album, was discovered by him on a Christmas compilation album, which he found by scouring the Internet while looking for unusual Christmas songs to cover; in this case, it was a country album, which included Gene Autry among its featured artists. The original version of this song, recorded by its writer Sonny James in 1954, sounded to Clapton like a pub song and reminded him of a scene he saw on a TV documentary, depicting a group of Romani people singing and having fun in a pub, so he arranged it in that style.

Artwork
The artwork for the album, consisting of cartoonish, childlike drawings, was created by Clapton himself, who drafted all of it very quickly on some sheets of paper he found in his hotel. The front cover features a Santa character who looks vaguely like Clapton, while the inner spread includes a Santa sleigh pulled by reindeer under a four-pointed Christmas star, as well as a Christmas tree. In his interview with Climie, Clapton jokes that the artwork took him "months and months" of failed attempts, before revealing the truth. He also states that he was inspired by Bob Dylan, who, as an accomplished painter, came up with his own artwork for several of his albums. The "Happy Xmas"/"E.C." lettering on the front cover, as well as the whole of the tracklist on the back, are also in Clapton’s own handwriting.

Track listing 

Tracks 15 and 16 were originally released, for Record Store Day 2018, on a 12" shaped picture disc, and later included on the European December 2018 re-release of the album.

Personnel

 Eric Clapton – guitar, lead vocals
 Doyle Bramhall II – guitar
 Walt Richmond – acoustic piano, keyboards
 Toby Baker – keyboards
 Simon Climie – keyboards, acoustic guitar, percussion, programming
 Tim Carmon – Hammond organ
 Dirk Powell – accordion, fiddle
 Nathan East – bass guitar
 Ringo Starr – drums
 Paul Waller – drum programming
 Nick Ingman – choir and string arrangements 
 Isobel Griffiths – strings contractor
 Tim Gill – cello
 Mary Scully – double bass
 Peter Lale – viola
 Perry Montague-Mason – violin
 Emlyn Singleton – violin
 Melia Clapton – backing vocals
 Sophie Clapton – backing vocals
 Sharon White – backing vocals
 Metro Voices – choir

Production
 Producers – Eric Clapton and Simon Climie
 Engineer – Alan Douglas
 Mixing – Simon Climie
 Mastering – Bob Ludwig at Gateway Mastering (Portland, ME).
 Layout – Jessie Kohn and John Logsdon
 Artwork – Eric Clapton

Charts

Weekly charts

Year-end charts

References

2018 Christmas albums
Christmas albums by English artists
Eric Clapton albums
Pop rock Christmas albums
Surfdog Records albums